Underneath the Gun was a Christian deathcore and metalcore band from Corona, California. While their sound originally was deathcore on the first EP and The Awakening full length, they evolved into a metalcore sound on the Forfeit Misfortunes album before disbanding due to vocalist Harrison DeGrote's health problems.

History
Underneath the Gun started in 2004 when the members were 12 years old. In 2006, the band released their debut EP, You Prepare The Bodies, I'll Get The Ice, via This City is Burning Records. Months later, the band released The Awakening, their debut album. In 2008, the band signed to Ferret Music, who re-released The Awakening as an EP. Underneath the Gun released their second album, Forfeit Misfortunes, again through Ferret. The album was recorded by Tim Lambesis of As I Lay Dying. The band had played with bands such as Job for a Cowboy, A Life Once Lost, August Burns Red, Suicide Silence, MyChildren MyBride, Don the Reader, KillWhitneyDead and Emmure. The band would continue on until 2009. It was announced that Underneath the Gun had disbanded because of Vocalist Harrison DeGrote's growing health concerns. The band was set to play Artery Metal Tour, with Impending Doom, Carnifex, Miss May I, Conducting the Grave, and Molotov Solution, but because of DeGrote's health issues, they were forced to drop out. Guitarist Trevor Vickers would go on to join Confide a year after they disbanded, while several other members joined Mirror of Dead Faces and Impending Doom.

Members

Final lineup
 Harrison DeGrote – vocals (2004-2009)
 Danny – guitars
 Trevor Vickers – guitars (2004-2009)(formerly of Confide)
 Kyle Simms – bass guitar
 Isaac Bueno – drums (formerly of Impending Doom, formerly of Mirror of Dead Faces)

Former
 Jake Foust – guitars (formerly of Impending Doom, formerly of Mirror of Dead Faces)
 Ryan Alipour – guitars
 Scotty Chappel – bass guitar
 Josh Patterson – drums
 Brandon Trahan – drums (Impending Doom, formerly of Mirror of Dead Faces, formerly of xDeathstarx)

Discography
Studio albums
 The Awakening (2006, This City is Burning)
 Forfeit Misfortunes (2009, Ferret)

EPs
 You Prepare the Bodies, I'll Prepare the Ice (2006, This City is Burning)

References

External links

American Christian metal musical groups
Metalcore musical groups from California
Death metal musical groups
Deathcore musical groups
Musical groups from California
Musical groups established in 2004
Musical groups disestablished in 2009
Ferret Music artists